Henri-Joseph de Forestier, born at San Domingo in 1790, was a pupil of Vincent and David, and obtained in 1813 the first prize, which enabled him to go to Rome. There he became very favourably known through his paintings of Anacreon and Cupid. He died in 1872. Among his historical and genre paintings may be mentioned:

Christ healing the Demoniac. 1817. (Louvre, Paris.)
The Funeral of William the Conqueror.

References
 

1790 births
1872 deaths
19th-century French painters
Dominican Republic people of French descent
French male painters
People from Santo Domingo
Pupils of Jacques-Louis David
Prix de Rome for painting
White Dominicans
18th-century French male artists